The County of Paintearth No. 18 is a municipal district in east central Alberta, Canada. Located in Census Division No. 7, its municipal office is located southeast of the Town of Castor near the intersection of Highway 12 and Highway 36.

History 
Originally incorporated in 1944 as the Municipal District of Paintearth No. 334, it was established as a county in 1962.

Demographics 

In the 2016 Census of Population conducted by Statistics Canada, the County of Paintearth No. 18 had a population of 2,102 living in 638 of its 696 total private dwellings, a  change from its 2011 population of 2,029.

Communities and localities 
 
The following urban municipalities are surrounded by the County of Paintearth No. 18.
Cities
none
Towns
Castor
Coronation
Villages
Halkirk
Summer villages
none

The following hamlets are located within the County of Paintearth No. 18.
Hamlets
Brownfield
Fleet

The following localities are located within the County of Paintearth No. 18.
Localities 
Battle River
Bulwark
Cordel
Federal
Hamilton Lake
Lure
Puffer
Silver Heights
Sullivan Lake
Talbot
Throne
Tinchebray
Veldt

See also 
List of communities in Alberta
List of municipal districts in Alberta

References

External links 

 
Paintearth